Sergey Ivanovich Menyaylo (Russian: Сергей Иванович Меняйло, ; born 22 August 1960) is a Russian politician. He has been acting Head of the Republic of North Ossetia since 9 April 2021.

Deputy commander of the Black Sea Fleet between 2009 and 2011. He served as the Governor of Sevastopol between 2014 and 2016, but left the post when he was appointed to be a Presidential Envoy of the Siberian Federal District (2016—2021).

Biography

Sergey Menyaylo was born in Alagir on 22 August 1960 to a Russian father and an Ossetian mother. In 1979, he graduated as a navigational engineer, and served in the Northern Fleet. 

In 1990 he was elected a member of the Murmansk Regional Council. In 2008 he participated in the Russo-Georgian War. The following year, he was appointed deputy commander of the Black Sea Fleet by Presidential decree.

In April 2010, he was candidate of the United Russia party for a position in North Ossetia-Alania.

In December 2011, he left military service. 

On 14 April 2014 Aleksei Chaly, the acting Governor of Sevastopol since the beginning of the Crimean Crisis of 2014, resigned his position and asked Vladimir Putin to appoint Menyaylo as the "interim governor" of Sevastopol. That same day he was confirmed in position by a presidential decree.

He resigned his position at the end of July 2016, and was later appointed as a Plenipotentiary Representative of the President of the Russian Federation in the Siberian Federal District.

On 19 September 2021, the parliament elected Menyaylo as the 6th Head of North Ossetia-Alania.

References

1960 births
Living people
1st class Active State Councillors of the Russian Federation
People from Alagirsky District
People of the Russo-Georgian War
Russian admirals
Soviet Navy personnel
United Russia politicians
N. G. Kuznetsov Naval Academy alumni
Military Academy of the General Staff of the Armed Forces of Russia alumni
Russian individuals subject to the U.S. Department of the Treasury sanctions
Russian individuals subject to European Union sanctions
Sanctioned due to Russo-Ukrainian War